Lieutenant General Jan van Loggerenberg  was a former South African military commander, who held the post of Chief of the South African Air Force.

He joined the Air force in 1954 and obtained a BMil degree from the South African Military Academy, earning the Student of the Year award in 1957. In 1959, he was appointed a flying instructor at Central Flying school.

He joined 1 Squadron and 2 Squadron before moving to 24 Squadron flying Buccaneers. He also attended a Canberra conversion course in England. In 1971, he was appointed Military Attache to Paris, France. On his return to South Africa, he was appointed the head of the South African Military Academy and thereafter Light Aircraft Command. He was appointed Chief of Staff operations in 1979.

In 1984, he was appointed Director: Operations of the SADF and in 1988 he was appointed Chief of the Air Force.

Awards and decorations 
 
 
 
 
 
 
 
 
 
 
  Permanent Force Good Service Medal 

 
  Grand Cross of Aeronautical Merit (Chile)
  Grand Star of Military Merit (Chile)

See also
List of South African military chiefs
South African Air Force
Atlas Carver

References

1935 births
2022 deaths
Afrikaner people
South African people of Dutch descent
South African Air Force generals
South African military personnel of the Border War
People from Ermelo, Mpumalanga
Chiefs of the South African Air Force
Military attachés